Qajar Kheyl (also romanized as Qājār Kheyl; also known as Ghajar Kheil) is a village in Rudpey-ye Shomali Rural District, in the Central District of Sari County, Mazandaran Province, Iran. At the time of the 2006 census, its population was 1,187 across 310 families.

References 

Populated places in Sari County